This is a list of villages in Troms, a county in Norway. For other counties see the lists of villages in Norway.  This list excludes cities located in Troms.  For multi-lingual areas, the Sami and/or Kven names are also given.  The villages that are the administrative centres of their municipalities are marked (†) and highlighted in blue.

References

External links

Troms